Enlighten Me may refer to:

 "Enlighten Me" (Echo & the Bunnymen song), 1990
 "Enlighten Me" (Grouplove song)
 "Enlighten Me" (Masterplan song)
 Enlighten Me (album), a 2015 album by Jaymay